Haploeax is a genus of longhorn beetles of the subfamily Lamiinae.

 Haploeax bimaculatus Breuning, 1977
 Haploeax bituberosa Breuning, 1939
 Haploeax burgeoni Breuning, 1935
 Haploeax cinerea Aurivillius, 1907
 Haploeax latefasciata Breuning, 1952
 Haploeax rohdei Aurivillius, 1907
 Haploeax triangularis (Breuning, 1948)

References

Ancylonotini